F-sharp major (or the key of F) is a major scale based on F, consisting of the pitches F, G, A, B, C, D, and E. Its key signature has six sharps.

The F-sharp major scale is:

Its relative minor is D-sharp minor (or enharmonically E-flat minor) and its parallel minor is F-sharp minor. Its direct enharmonic, G-flat major, contains the same number of flats in its key signature.

Music in F-sharp major 

F-sharp major is the key of the minuet in Haydn's "Farewell" Symphony, of Beethoven's Piano Sonata No. 24, Op. 78, Verdi's "Va, pensiero" from Nabucco, a part of Franz Liszt's Hungarian Rhapsody No. 2, Mahler's unfinished Tenth Symphony, Korngold's Symphony Op. 40, and Scriabin's Fourth Piano Sonata. The key was the favorite tonality of Olivier Messiaen, who used it repeatedly throughout his work to express his most exciting or transcendent moods, most notably in the Turangalîla-Symphonie.

Like G-flat major, F-sharp major is rarely used in orchestral music, other than in passing. It is more common in piano music. Some examples include a Nocturne and the Barcarolle by Chopin, the sonatas of Alexander Scriabin and several pieces from Grieg's Lyric Pieces.

Liszt was apparently fond of F-sharp major, having uplifting while meditative pieces like "Les jeux d'eaux à la villa d'este" from Années de Pèlerinage III, S.163 and "Bénediction de Dieu dans la Solitude" from the set Harmonies Poétiques et Religieuses S.173 in this key. There's also a transition to an energetic passage in the Dante Sonata that is in F-sharp.

Despite the key rarely being used in orchestral music other than to modulate, it is not entirely uncommon in keyboard music. For orchestration of piano music, some theorists recommend transposing the music to F major or G major. If F-sharp major must absolutely be used, one should take care that B♭ wind instruments be notated in A-flat major, rather than G-sharp major (or E♮/B♮ instruments used instead, giving a transposed key of D major/G major).

References

External links

List of instrumental music in F-sharp major, stephenjablonsky.net

Musical keys
Major scales